Baron FitzHardinge, of the City and County of the City of Bristol, was a title in the Peerage of the United Kingdom. It was created on 5 August 1861 for the naval commander and politician Admiral Sir Maurice Berkeley. He was among pre-official marriage so illegitimate sons of Frederick Berkeley, 5th Earl of Berkeley and his wife. Among his brothers were Thomas Berkeley, 6th Earl of Berkeley and William Berkeley, 1st Earl FitzHardinge (a title extinguished by death, 1857).

He was succeeded by his eldest son, the second Baron. He was a Liberal politician. His son was succeeded by his younger brother, the third Baron, who briefly represented Gloucester as MP, on whose 1916 death the title ended.

Baron FitzHardinge (1861)
Maurice Frederick FitzHardinge Berkeley, 1st Baron FitzHardinge (1788–1867)
Francis William FitzHardinge Berkeley, 2nd Baron FitzHardinge (1826–1896)
Charles Paget FitzHardinge Berkeley, 3rd Baron FitzHardinge (1830–1916)

See also
Earl of Berkeley

References

Extinct baronies in the Peerage of the United Kingdom
FitzHardinge
Noble titles created in 1861
Noble titles created for UK MPs